The Jeddah Metro is an under construction metro system in the city of Jeddah, Saudi Arabia. Several lines will be built over the course of at least five years that will eventually aim to increase public transport commuter share to 30% from the current 1 to 2 percent.

Planning
The metro was approved in March 2013. SYSTRA was chosen as the project engineer in 2014. It should be completed in 2020.  Completion has been pushed back to 2025.

Foster and Partners is to design the stations, trains and branding.

Network
A total of three lines are planned. Phase 1 would link the King Abdulaziz International Airport with the Prince Abdullah Al-Faisal Stadium, central Al-Ruwais and Al-Khozam.

 Line  
 Line 
 Line 

A tram line is also planned.

See also
 Makkah Metro
 Madinah Metro
 Riyadh Metro
 Haramain High Speed Rail Project
 List of metro systems

References

External links
Jeddah Metro Company

Metro
Rapid transit in Saudi Arabia
Proposed rapid transit
Proposed rail infrastructure in Saudi Arabia